The Lenape (or ,) also called the Lenni Lenape, and Delaware people, are an Indigenous people of the Northeastern Woodlands, who live in the United States and Canada. 

Today, Lenape people belong to the Delaware Nation and Delaware Tribe of Indians in Oklahoma; the Stockbridge–Munsee Community in Wisconsin; and the Munsee-Delaware Nation, Moravian of the Thames First Nation, and Delaware of Six Nations in Ontario.

Their historical territory included present-day northeastern Delaware, New Jersey, the Lehigh Valley and other regions of eastern Pennsylvania, New York City, western Long Island, and the lower Hudson Valley. During the last decades of the 18th century, most Lenape were displaced from their homelands by white settlers. The divisions and troubles of the American Revolutionary War and United States' independence pushed them farther west. In the 1860s, the United States government sent most Lenape remaining in the Eastern United States to the Indian Territory, which is in present-day Oklahoma and surrounding regions, under the Indian removal policy.

Name
Alternately,  may be translated as "man".

The Lenape, when first encountered by Europeans, were a loose association of related peoples who spoke similar languages and shared familial bonds in an area known as Lenapehoking, the Lenape traditional territory, which spanned what is now eastern Pennsylvania, New Jersey, Lower New York, and eastern Delaware.

The tribe's common name Delaware is not of Native American origin. English colonists named the Delaware River for the first governor of the Province of Virginia, Thomas West, 3rd Baron De La Warr, whose title was ultimately derived from French. (For etymology of the surname, see Earl De La Warr§Etymology.) The English colonists then began to call the Lenape the "Delaware Indians" because of where they lived. Swedish colonists also settled in the area, and Swedish-language sources listed the Lenape as the Renappi.

Territory

Traditional Lenape lands, the Lenapehoking, was a large territory that encompassed the Delaware Valley of eastern Pennsylvania and New Jersey from the north bank of the Lehigh River along the west bank of the Delaware then south into Delaware and the Delaware Bay. Their lands also extended west from western Long Island and New York Bay, across the Lower Hudson Valley in New York into the lower Catskills and a sliver of the upper edge of the North Branch Susquehanna River. On the west side, the Lenape lived in numerous small towns along the rivers and streams that fed the waterways, and likely shared the hunting territory of the Schuylkill River watershed with the rival Iroquoian Susquehannock.

Languages
The Unami and Munsee languages belong to the Eastern Algonquian language group and are largely mutually intelligible. Moravian missionary John Heckewelder wrote that Munsee and Unami "came out of one parent language." Today, only a few Delaware First Nation elders in Moraviantown, Ontario, fluently speak Munsee; however, adults and children are learning the languages in various programs.

Penn instructed his fellow English colonists: "If one asks them for anything they have not, they will answer, which to translate is, 'not I have,' instead of 'I have not'."

The Lenape languages used to be exclusively a spoken language. However, in 2002, the Delaware Tribe of Indians received grant money to fund The Lenape Talking Dictionary, preserving and digitizing the Southern Unami dialect.

Shelley DePaul of the Lenape Nation of Pennsylvania has researched the language and created classes with Theodore Fernald at Swarthmore College. Research shows that voluntary, locally based language practice and learning is key to restoring and maintaining a fading language. DePaul's approach focuses on a "living language" philosophy.

Society

Clans and kinship systems
At the time of European contact, a Lenape person would have identified primarily with his or her immediate family and clan, friends, and/or village unit; then with surrounding and familiar village units. Next with more distant neighbors who spoke the same dialect; and ultimately, with all those in the surrounding area who spoke mutually comprehensible languages, including the Nanticoke people, who lived to their south and west in present western Delaware and eastern Maryland, and the Munsee, who lived to their north. Among many Algonquian peoples along the East Coast, the Lenape were considered the "grandfathers" from whom other Algonquian-speaking peoples originated.

The Lenape had three clans at the end of the 17th century, each of which historically had twelve sub-clans:
 Wolf, Tùkwsit

 Big Feet, Mä an'greet
 Yellow Tree, Wisawhìtkuk
 Pulling Corn, Pä-sakun'a'-mon
 Care Enterer, We-yar-nih'kä-to
 Across the River, Toosh-war-ka'ma
 Vermillion, O-lum'-a-ne
 Dog standing by fireside, Pun-ar'-you
 Long Body, Kwin-eek'cha
 Digging, Moon-har-tar'ne
 Pulling up Stream, Non-har'-min
 Brush Log, Long-ush-har-kar'-to
 Bringing Along, Maw-soo-toh

 Turtle, Pùkuwànku

 Ruler, O-ka-ho'-ki
 High Bank Shore, Ta-ko-ong'-o-to
 Drawing Down Hill, See-har-ong'-o-to
 Elector, Ole-har-kar-me'kar-to
 Brave, Ma-har-o-luk'-ti
 Green Leaves, Toosh-ki-pa-kwis-i
 Smallest Turtle, Tung-ul-ung'-si
 Little Turtle, We-lung-ung-sil
 Snapping Turtle, Lee-kwin-a-i'''
 Deer, Kwis-aese-kees'to Turkey, Pële Big Bird, Mor-har-ä-lä Bird's Cry, Le-le-wa'-you Eye Pain, Moo-kwung-wa-ho'ki Scratch the Path, Moo-har-mo-wi-kar'-nu Opossum Ground, O-ping-ho'-ki Old Shin, Muh-ho-we-kä'-ken Drift Log, Tong-o-nä-o-to Living in Water, Nool-a-mar-lar'-mo Root Digger, Muh-krent-har'-ne Red Face, Mur-karm-huk-se Pine Region, Koo-wä-ho'ke Ground Scratcher, Oo-ckuk'-hamThe Lenape have a matrilineal clan system and historically were matrilocal. Children belong to their mother's clan, from which they gain social status and identity. The mother's eldest brother was more significant as a mentor to the male children than was their father, who was generally of another clan. Hereditary leadership passed through the maternal line, and women elders could remove leaders of whom they disapproved. Agricultural land was managed by women and allotted according to the subsistence needs of their extended families.  Newlywed couples would live with the bride's family, where her mother and sisters could also assist her with her growing family.

By 1682, when William Penn arrived to his American commonwealth, the Lenape had been so reduced by disease, famine, and war that the sub-clan mothers had reluctantly resolved to consolidate their families into the main clan family. This is why William Penn and all those after him believed that the Lenape clans had always only had three divisions (Turtle, Turkey, and Wolf) when, in fact, they had over thirty on the eve of European contact.

Members of each clan were found throughout Lenape territory, and while clan mothers controlled the land, the houses, and the families, the clan fathers provided the meat, cleared the fields, built the houses, and protected the clan. Upon reaching adulthood, a Lenape male would marry outside of his clan. The practice effectively prevented inbreeding, even among individuals whose kinship was obscure or unknown. This means that a male from the Turkey Clan was expected to marry a female from either the Turtle or Wolf clans. His children, however, would not belong to the Turkey Clan, but to the mother's clan. As such, a person's mother's brothers (the person's matrilineal uncles) played a large role in his or her life as they shared the same clan lineage. Within a marriage itself, men and women had relatively separate and equal rights, each controlling their own property and debts, showing further signs of a woman's power in the hierarchical structure.

As in the case of the Iroquois and Susquehannocks, the animosity of differences and competitions spanned many generations, and in general tribes with each of the different language groups became traditional enemies in the areas they'd meet. On the other hand, The New American Book of Indians points out that competition, trade, and wary relations were far more common than outright warfare—but both larger societies had traditions of 'proving' (blooding) new (or young) warriors by 'counting coup' on raids into another tribes territories. The two groups were sometimes bitter enemies since before recorded history, but intermarriage occurred — and both groups have an oral history suggesting they jointly came east together and displaced the mound builders culture. In addition, both tribes practiced adopting young captives from warfare into their tribes and assimilating them as full tribal members. Iroquoians adopting Lenape (or other peoples) were known to be part of their religious beliefs, the adopted one taking the place in the clan of one killed in warfare.

Early European observers may have misinterpreted matrilineal Lenape cultural practices. For example, a man's maternal uncle (his mother's brother), and not his father, was usually considered to be his closest male relative, since his uncle belonged to his mother's clan and his father belonged to a different one. The maternal uncle played a more prominent role in the lives of his sister's children than did the father—for example likely being the one responsible for educating a young man in weapons craft, martial arts, hunting, and other life skills.

 Hunting, fishing, and farming 
Lenape practiced companion planting, in which women cultivated many varieties of the "Three Sisters": maize, beans, and squash. Men hunted, fished, and otherwise harvested seafood. In the 17th century, the Lenape practiced slash and burn agriculture. They used fire to manage land.Day, Gordon M. "The Indian as an Ecological Factor in the Northeastern Forests." Ecology, Vol. 34, #2 (April 1953): 329–346. New England and New York Areas 1580–1800.Russell, Emily W.B. "Indian Set Fires in the Forests of the Northeastern United States." Ecology, Vol. 64, no. 1 (Feb. 1983): 78, 88.Smithsonian Institution—Handbook of North American Indians series: Handbook of North American Indians, Volume 15—Northeast. Bruce G. Trigger (volume editor). Washington, DC: Smithsonian Institution. 1978 References to Indian burning for the Eastern Algonquians, Virginia Algonquians, Northern Iroquois, Huron, Mahican, and Delaware Tribes and peoples. Controlled use of fire extended farmlands' productivity. According to Dutch settler Isaac de Rasieres, who observed the Lenape in 1628, the Lenape planted their primary crop, maize, in March. They quickly adopted European metal tools for this task.

The men limited their agricultural labor to clearing the field and breaking the soil. They primarily hunted and fished during the rest of the year: from September to January and from June to July, they mainly hunted deer, but from the month of January to the spring planting in May, they hunted anything from bears and beavers to raccoons and foxes. Dutch settler David de Vries, who stayed in the area from 1634 to 1644, described a Lenape hunt in the valley of the Achinigeu-hach (or "Ackingsah-sack", the Hackensack River), in which one hundred or more men stood in a line many paces from each other, beating thigh bones on their palms to drive animals to the river, where they could be killed easily. Other methods of hunting included lassoing and drowning deer, as well as forming a circle around prey and setting the brush on fire. They also harvested vast quantities of fish and shellfish from the bays of the area, and, in southern New Jersey, harvested clams year-round. One technique used while fishing was to add ground chestnuts to stream water to make fish dizzy and easier to catch.

The success of these methods allowed the tribe to maintain a larger population than other, nomadic hunter-gatherer peoples in North America at the time, could support. Scholars have estimated that at the time of European settlement, around much of the current New York City area alone, there may have been about 15,000 Lenape in approximately 80 settlement sites. In 1524, Lenape in canoes met Giovanni da Verrazzano, the first European explorer to enter New York Harbor.

European settlers and traders from the 17th-century colonies of New Netherland and New Sweden traded with the Lenape for agricultural products, mainly maize, in exchange for iron tools. The Lenape also arranged contacts between the Minquas or Susquehannocks and the Dutch West India Company and Swedish South Company to promote the fur trade. The Lenape were major producers of labor intensive wampum, or shell beads, which they traditionally used for ritual purposes and as ornaments. After the Dutch arrival, they began to exchange wampum for beaver furs provided by Iroquoian-speaking Susquehannock and other Minquas. They exchanged these furs for Dutch and, from the late 1630s, also Swedish imports. Relations between some Lenape and Minqua polities briefly turned sour in the late 1620s and early 1630s, but were relatively peaceful most of the time.

 Clothing and adornment 
The early European settlers, especially the Dutch and Swedes, were surprised at the Lenape's skill in fashioning clothing from natural materials. In hot weather men and women wore only loin cloth and skirt respectively, while they used beaver pelts or bear skins to serve as winter mantles. Additionally, both sexes might wear buckskin leggings and moccasins in cold weather. Women would wear their hair long, usually below the hip, while men kept only a small "round crest, of about 2 inches in diameter". Deer hair, dyed a deep scarlet, as well as plumes of feathers, were favorite components of headdresses and breast ornaments for males. The Lenape also adorned themselves with various ornaments made of stone, shell, animal teeth, and claws. The women often wore headbands of dyed deer hair or wampum. They painted their skin skirts or decorated them with porcupine quills. These skirts were so elaborately appointed that, when seen from a distance, they reminded Dutch settlers of fine European lace. The winter cloaks of the women were striking, fashioned from the iridescent body feathers of wild turkeys.

 Leisure  
One of the more common activities of leisure for the Lenni Lenape would be the game of pahsaheman: a football-like hybrid, split on gender lines. Over a hundred players were grouped into gendered teams (male and female), and would attempt to get a ball through the other team's goal post. However, men could not carry and pass the ball, only using their feet, while the women could carry, pass, or kick. If the ball was picked up by a woman, she could not be tackled by the men, although men could attempt to dislodge the ball. Women were free to tackle the men. These gender-split rules highlight how a woman's role in Lenape society was harmonious to a man's role, rather than acquiescent.

Another activity common was that of dance, and yet again, gender differences appear: men would dance and leap loudly, often with bear claw accessories, while women, wearing little thimbles or bells, would dance more modestly, stepping "one foot after the other slightly forwards then backwards, yet so as to advance gradually."

 Units of measure  

A number of linear measures were used. Small units of measure were the distance from the thumb and first finger, and the distance from first finger to pit of elbow. Travel distance was measured in the distance one could comfortably travel from sun-up to sun-down.

Ethnobotany
Lenape herbalists, who have been primarily women, use their extensive knowledge of plant life to help heal their community's ailments, sometimes through ceremony. The Lenape found uses in trees like black walnut which were used to cure ringworm and with persimmons which were used to cure ear problems.

The Lenape carry the nuts of Aesculus glabra in the pocket for rheumatism, and an infusion of ground nuts mixed with sweet oil or mutton tallow for earaches. They also grind the nuts and use them to poison fish in streams. They also apply a poultice of pulverized nuts with sweet oil for earache.

History

European contact
The first recorded European contact with people presumed to have been the Lenape was in 1524. The explorer Giovanni da Verrazzano was greeted by local Lenape who came by canoe, after his ship entered what is now called Lower New York Bay.

Early colonial era
At the time of sustained European contact in the 1600s and 1700s, the Lenape were a powerful Native American nation who inhabited a region on the mid-Atlantic coast spanning the latitudes of southern Massachusetts to the southern extent of Delaware in what anthropologists call the Northeastern Woodlands. Although never politically unified, the confederation of the Lenape roughly encompassed the area around and between the Delaware and lower Hudson rivers, and included the western part of Long Island in present-day New York. Some of their place names, such as Manhattan ("the island of many hills"), Raritan, and Tappan were adopted by Dutch and English colonists to identify the Lenape people that lived there.

17th century

The Lenape had a culture in which the clan and family controlled property. Europeans often tried to contract for land with the tribal chiefs, confusing their culture with that of neighboring tribes such as the Iroquois. As a further complication in communication and understanding, kinship terms commonly used by European settlers had very different meanings to the Lenape: "fathers" did not have the same direct parental control as in Europe, "brothers" could be a symbol of equality but could also be interpreted as one's parallel cousins, "cousins" were interpreted as only cross-cousins, etc. All of these added complexities in kinship terms made agreements with Europeans all the more difficult. The Lenape would petition for grievances on the basis that not all their families had been recognized in the transaction (not that they wanted to "share" the land). After the Dutch arrival in the 1620s, the Lenape were successful in restricting Dutch settlement until the 1660s to Pavonia in present-day Jersey City along the Hudson. The Dutch finally established a garrison at Bergen, which allowed settlement west of the Hudson within the province of New Netherland. This land was purchased from the Lenape after the fact.

New Amsterdam was founded in 1624 by the Dutch in what would later become New York City. Dutch settlers also founded a colony at present-day Lewes, Delaware, on June 3, 1631 and named it Zwaanendael (Swan Valley). The colony had a short life, as in 1632 a local band of Lenape killed the 32 Dutch settlers after a misunderstanding escalated over Lenape defacement of the insignia of the Dutch West India Company. In 1634, the Iroquoian-speaking Susquehannock went to war with the Lenape over access to trade with the Dutch at New Amsterdam. They defeated the Lenape, and some scholars believe that the Lenape may have become tributaries to the Susquehannock. After the warfare, the Lenape referred to the Susquehannock as "uncles". The Iroquois added the Lenape to the Covenant Chain in 1676; the Lenape were tributary to the Five Nations (later Six) until 1753, shortly before the outbreak of the French and Indian War (a part of the Seven Years' War in Europe).

Based on the historical record of the mid-17th century, it has been estimated that most Lenape polities consisted of several hundred people but it is conceivable that some had been considerably larger prior to close contact, given the wars between the Susquehannocks and the Iroquois, both of whom were armed by the Dutch fur traders, while the Lenape were at odds with the Dutch and so lost that particular arms race.

During the Beaver Wars in the first half of the 17th century, European colonists were careful to keep firearms from the coastally located Lenape, while rival Iroquoian peoples such as the Susquehannocks and Confederation of the Iroquois became comparatively well armed. Subsequently, the Lenape became subjugated and made tributary to first the Susquehannocks, then the Iroquois, even needing their rivals' (superiors') agreement to initiate treaties such as land sales. 

Epidemics of newly introduced European infectious diseases, such as smallpox, measles, cholera, influenza, and dysentery, reduced the populations of Lenape. They and other Native peoples had no natural immunity. Recurrent violent conflicts with Europeans also devastated Lenape people.

The Lenape also fought intertribal warfare, particularly with the Haudenosaunee. The Lenape and Susquehannocks fought a war in the middle of the 17th century that left the Lenape a tributary state even as the Susquehannocks had defeated the Province of Maryland between 1642–50s.
The Lenape's quick adoption of trade goods, and their desire to trap furs to meet high European demand, resulted in over-harvesting the beaver population in the lower Hudson Valley. With the fur sources exhausted, the Dutch shifted their operations to present-day upstate New York. The Lenape who produced wampum in the vicinity of Manhattan Island temporarily forestalled the negative effects of the decline in trade.

In 1682, William Penn and Quaker colonists created the English colony of Pennsylvania beginning at the lower Delaware River. A peace treaty was negotiated between the newly arriving colonists and Lenape at what is now known as Penn Treaty Park. In the decades immediately following, some 20,000 new colonists arrived in the region, putting pressure on Lenape settlements and hunting grounds. Penn expected his authority and that of the colonial government to take precedence. His new colony effectively displaced many Lenape and forced others to adapt to new cultural demands. Penn gained a reputation for benevolence and tolerance, but his efforts resulted in more effective colonization of the ancestral Lenape homeland than previous ones.

18th century

William Penn died in 1718. His heirs, John and Thomas Penn, and their agents were running the colony, and had abandoned many of the elder Penn's practices. Trying to raise money, they contemplated ways to sell Lenape land to colonial settlers. The resulting scheme culminated in the so-called Walking Purchase. In the mid-1730s, colonial administrators produced a draft of a land deed dating to the 1680s. William Penn had approached several leaders of Lenape polities in the lower Delaware to discuss land sales further north. Since the land in question did not belong to their polities, the talks came to nothing. But colonial administrators had prepared the draft that resurfaced in the 1730s. The Penns and their supporters tried to present this draft as a legitimate deed. Lenape leaders in the lower Delaware refused to accept it.

According to historian Steven Harper, what followed was a "convoluted sequence of deception, fraud, and extortion orchestrated by the Pennsylvania government that is commonly known as the Walking Purchase." In the end, all Lenape who still lived on the Delaware were driven off the remnants of their homeland under threats of violence. Some Lenape polities eventually retaliated by attacking Pennsylvania settlements. When they resisted European colonial expansion at the height of the French and Indian War, the British colonial authorities investigated the causes of Lenape resentment. The British asked Sir William Johnson, Superintendent of Indian Affairs, to lead the investigation. Johnson had become wealthy as a trader and acquired thousands of acres of land in the Mohawk River Valley from the Iroquois Mohawk of New York.

Beginning in the 18th century, the Moravian Church established missions among the Lenape. The Moravians required the Christian converts to share their pacifism, as well as to live in a structured and European-style mission village. Moravian pacifism and unwillingness to take loyalty oaths caused conflicts with British colonial authorities, who were seeking aid against the French and their Native American allies during the Seven Years' War. The Moravians' insistence on Christian Lenapes' abandoning traditional warfare practices alienated mission populations from other Lenape and Native American groups, who revered warriors. The Moravians accompanied Lenape relocations to Ohio and Canada, continuing their missionary work. The Moravian Lenape who settled permanently in Ontario after the American Revolutionary War were sometimes referred to as "Christian Munsee", as they mostly spoke the Munsee branch of the Lenape language.

During the French and Indian War, the Lenape initially sided with the French, as they hoped to prevent further European colonial encroachment in their territory. But, such leaders as Teedyuscung in the east and Tamaqua in the vicinity of modern Pittsburgh shifted to building alliances with the British colonial authorities. After the end of the war, however, Anglo-American settlers continued to attack the Lenape, often to such an extent that the historian Amy Schutt writes the dead since the wars outnumbered those killed during the war.

In 1757, the "New Jersey Association for Helping the Indians" wrote a constitution to expel native Munsee Lenape from their home in the Washington Valley of Morris County, New Jersey. Led by Reverend John Brainerd, colonists forcefully relocated 200 people to Indian Mills, then known as Brotherton. It was then an industrial town, known for gristmills and sawmills. This was the first Native American reservation in New Jersey. Reverend John Brainerd abandoned the reservation in 1777.

The Treaty of Easton, signed in 1758 between the Lenape and the Anglo-American colonists, required the Lenape to move westward, out of present-day New York and New Jersey and into Pennsylvania, then Ohio and beyond. Through the 18th century, many Lenape moved west into the relatively depopulated upper Ohio River basin.Sporadically they continued to raid European-American settlers from far outside the area.

In 1763, Bill Hickman, Lenape, warned English colonists in the Juniata River region of an impending attack. Many Lenape joined in Pontiac's War, and were numerous among those Native Americans who besieged Pittsburgh.

In April 1763, Teedyuscung was killed when his home was burned. His son Captain Bull responded by attacking settlers from New England who had migrated to the Wyoming Valley of Pennsylvania. The settlers had been sponsored by the Susquehanna Company.

 American Revolutionary War 

Background
After the signing of the Treaty of Easton in 1758, the Lenape were forced to move west out of their original lands into what is today known as Ohio.

During the French and Indian War, Killbuck had assisted the British against the French and their Indian allies. In 1761, Killbuck led a British supply train from Fort Pitt to Fort Sandusky. During the early 1770s, missionaries, including David Zeisberger and John Heckewelder, arrived in the Ohio Country near the Lenape  villages. The Moravian Church sent these men to convert the Indigenous peoples to Christianity. The missionaries established several missions, including Gnadenhutten, Lichtenau, and Schoenbrunn. The missionaries pressured Indigenous people to abandon their traditional customs, beliefs, and ways of life, and to replace them with European and Christian ways. Many Lenape did adopt Christianity, but others refused to do so. The Lenape became a divided people during the 1770s, including in Killbuck's family. Killbuck resented his grandfather for allowing the Moravians to remain in the Ohio country. The Moravians believed in pacifism, and Killbuck believed that every convert to the Moravians deprived the Lenape of a warrior to stop further white settlement of their land.

War
When the American Revolutionary War began, Killbuck found the Lenape caught between the British and their Indian allies in the West and the Americans in the East. At the war's beginning, Killbuck and many Lenape claimed to be neutral. In 1778, Killbuck permitted American soldiers to traverse Lenape territory so that the soldiers could attack British-held Fort Detroit. In return, Killbuck requested that the Americans build a fort near the major village of Coshocton, to provide the Lenape with protection from potential attacks by British-allied Indians and Loyalists. The Americans agreed and built Fort Laurens, which they garrisoned.

At the time of the Revolutionary War, the Lenape in Ohio were deeply divided over which side, if any, to take in the war. During this time, the Lenape bands were living in numerous villages around their main village of Coshocton, between the western frontier strongholds of the British and the Patriots. The American colonists had Fort Pitt (present-day Pittsburgh) and the British, along with Indian allies, controlled the area of Fort Detroit (in present-day Michigan).

Other Indian communities, particularly the Wyandot, the Mingo, the Shawnee, and the Wolf Clan of the Lenape, favored the British. They believed that by their proclamation of 1763, restricting Anglo-American settlement to east of the Appalachian Mountains, that the British would help them preserve a Native American territory. The British made plans to attack Fort Laurens in early 1779 and demanded that the neutral Lenape formally side with the British. Killbuck warned the Americans of the planned attack. His actions helped save the fort, but the Americans abandoned it in August 1779. The Lenape had lost their protectors and found themselves without solid allies in the conflict, which compounded their dispossession at the hand of encroaching American pioneers during and after the war.

Some Lenape decided to take up arms against the American settlers and moved to the west, closer to Detroit, where they settled on the Scioto and Sandusky rivers. Those Lenape sympathetic to the United States remained at Coshocton, and Lenape leaders signed the Treaty of Fort Pitt (1778) with the American colonists. Through this treaty, the Lenape hoped to establish the Ohio country as a state inhabited exclusively by Native Americans, as a subset of the new United States. A third group of Lenape, many of them converted Christian Munsees, lived in several mission villages run by Moravians. Like the other bands, they also spoke the Munsee branch of Lenape, an Algonquian language.

White Eyes, the Lenape chief who had negotiated the treaty, died in 1778. Subsequently many Lenape at Coshocton eventually joined the war against the Americans. In response, American military officer Daniel Brodhead led an expedition out of Fort Pitt and on 19 April 1781, and destroyed Coshocton. Surviving residents fled to the north. Colonel Brodhead convinced the militia to leave the Lenape at the Moravian mission villages unmolested, since they were unarmed non-combatants.

 Treaties of the late 18th century 
The Lenape were the first Indian tribe to enter into a treaty with the new United States government, with the Treaty of Fort Pitt signed in 1778 during the American Revolutionary War. By then living mostly in the Ohio Country, the Lenape supplied the Continental Army with warriors and scouts in exchange for food supplies and security.

In 1780, Munsee-speaking Lenape community leaders native to the Washington Valley that had been forcibly displaced to Brotherton, wrote a community treaty to oppose selling any more land to white settlers:In 1796, the Oneidas of New Stockbridge invited the Munsee Lenape to their reservation. The initial Lenape response was negative; in 1798, Lenape community leaders Bartholomew Calvin, Jason Skekit, and 18 others signed a public statement of refusal to leave "our fine place in Jersey." However, the tribe later agreed to relocate to New Stockbridge to join the Oneidas. A few Lenape households stayed behind to assimilate in New Jersey.

19th century
In the early 19th century the amateur anthropologist Silas Wood published a book claiming that there were several American Indian tribes that were distinct to Long Island, New York. He collectively called them the Metoac. Modern scientific scholarship has shown that in fact two linguistic groups representing two distinct Algonquian cultural identities lived on the island, not "13 individual tribes" as asserted by Wood. The bands to the west were Lenape. Those to the east were more related culturally to the Algonquian tribes of New England across Long Island Sound, such as the Pequot.Bragdon, Kathleen. The Columbia Guide to American Indians of the Northeast,Columbia University Press (2002). . Wood (and earlier settlers) often misinterpreted the Indian use of place names for autonyms.

Over a period of 176 years, European settlers pushed the Lenape out of the East Coast, through to Ohio and eventually further west. Most members of the Munsee-language branch of the Lenape left the United States after the British were defeated in the American Revolutionary War. Their descendants live on three Indian reserves in Western Ontario, Canada. They are descendants of those Lenape of Ohio Country who sided with the British during the Revolutionary War. The largest reserve is at Moraviantown, Ontario, where the Turtle Phratry settled in 1792 following the war.

Two groups migrated to Oneida County, New York, by 1802, the Brotherton Indians of New Jersey and the Stockbridge-Munsee. In 1822, the Munsee Lenape of Washington Valley who had moved to Stockbridge were forcefully displaced by white colonists again, over 900 miles' travel away, to Green Bay, Wisconsin.

 Indiana to Missouri 
By the Treaty of St. Mary's, signed October 3, 1818, in St. Mary's, Ohio, the Lenape ceded their lands in Indiana for lands west of the Mississippi and an annuity of $4,000. Anderson, Indiana, is named after Chief William Anderson, whose father was Swedish. The Delaware Village in Indiana was called Anderson's Town, while the Delaware Village in Missouri on the James River was often called Anderson's Village. The tribes' cabins and cornfields were spread out along the James River and Wilsons Creek.

Role in western history
Many Lenape participated in the exploration of the western United States, working as trappers with the mountain men, and as guides and hunters for wagon trains. They served as army guides and scouts in events such as the Second Seminole War, Frémont's expeditions, and the conquest of California during the Mexican–American War.Sides, Hampton, Blood and Thunder: An Epic of the American West, Doubleday (2006), pp. 77–80, 94, 101, hardcover, 462 pages,  Occasionally, they played surprising roles as Indian allies.

Sagundai accompanied one of Frémont's expeditions as one of his Lenape guides. From California, Fremont needed to communicate with Senator Benton. Sagundai volunteered to carry the message through some 2,200 kilometres (1367 miles) of hostile territory. He took many scalps in this adventure, including that of a Comanche with a particularly fine horse, who had outrun both Sagundai and the other Comanche. Sagundai was thrown when his horse stepped into a prairie-dog hole, but avoided the Comanche's lance, shot the warrior dead, and caught his horse and escaped the other Comanche. When Sagundai returned to his own people in present-day Kansas, they celebrated his exploits with the last war and scalp dances of their history, which were held at Edwardsville, Kansas.

Kansas reservation
By the terms of the "Treaty of the James Fork" that was signed on September 24, 1829, and ratified by the U.S. Senate in 1830, the Lenape were forced to move further west. They were granted lands in Indian Territory in exchange for lands on the James Fork of the White River in Missouri. These lands, in what is now Kansas, were west of the Missouri and north of the Kansas River.

In 1854, Congress passed the Kansas–Nebraska Act, which created the Territory of Kansas and opened the area for white settlement. It also authorized negotiation with Indian tribes regarding removal. The Lenape were reluctant to negotiate for yet another relocation, but they feared serious trouble with white settlers, and conflict developed.

As the Lenape were not considered United States citizens, they had no access to the courts and no way to enforce their property rights. The United States Army was to enforce their rights to reservation land after the Indian Agent had both posted a public notice warning trespassers and served written notice on them, a process generally considered onerous. Major B.F. Robinson, the Indian Agent appointed in 1855, did his best, but could not control the hundreds of white trespassers who stole stock, cut timber, and built houses and squatted on Lenape lands. By 1860, the Lenpae had reached consensus to leave Kansas, which was in accord with the government's Indian removal policy.

Oklahoma
The main body of Lenape arrived in Indian Territory in the 1860s. The two federally recognized tribes of Lenape in Oklahoma are the Delaware Nation, headquartered in Anadarko, Oklahoma, and the Delaware Tribe of Indians, headquartered in Bartlesville, Oklahoma.

The Delaware Tribe of Indians were required to purchase land from the reservation of the Cherokee Nation; they made two payments totaling $438,000. A court dispute followed over whether the sale included rights for the Lenape as citizens within the Cherokee Nation. While the dispute was unsettled, the Curtis Act of 1898 dissolved tribal governments and ordered the allotment of communal tribal lands to individual households of members of tribes.  After the lands were allotted in 160-acre (650,000 m2) lots to tribal members in 1907, the government sold "surplus" land to non-Indians.

Texas
 Spanish Texas
The Lenape migrated into Texas in the late 18th and early 19th centuries. Elements of the Lenape migrated from Missouri into Texas around 1820, settling around the Red River and Sabine River. The Lenape were peaceful and shared their territory in Spanish Texas with the Caddo and other immigrating bands, as well as with the Spanish and ever-increasing American population. This peaceful trend continued after Mexico won their independence from Spain in 1821.

 Mexican Texas
In 1828, Mexican General Manuel de Mier y Terán made an inspection of eastern Mexican Texas and estimated that the region housed between 150 and 200 Lenape families. The Lenape requested Mier y Terán to issue them land grants and send teachers, so they might learn to read and write the Spanish language. The general, impressed with how well they had adapted to the Mexican culture, sent their request to Mexico City, but the authorities never granted the Lenape any legal titles.
 
The situation changed when the Texas Revolution began in 1835. Texas officials were eager to gain the support of the Texas tribes to their side and offered to recognize their land claims by sending three commissioners to negotiate a treaty. A treaty was agreed upon in February 1836 that mapped the boundaries of Indian lands, but this agreement was never officially ratified by the Texas government.

 Texas Republic

The Lenape remained friendly after Texas won its independence. Republic of Texas President Sam Houston favored a policy of peaceful relations with all tribes. He sought the services of the friendly Lenape and, in 1837, enlisted several Lenape to protect the frontier from hostile western tribes. Lenape scouts joined with Texas Rangers as they patrolled the western frontier. Houston also tried to get the Lenape land claims recognized, but his efforts were met only by opposition.

The next Texan President, Mirabeau B. Lamar, completely opposed all Indians. He considered them illegal intruders who threatened the settlers' safety and lands and issued an order for their removal from Texas. The Lenape were sent north of the Red River into Indian Territory, although a few scattered Lenape remained in Texas.

In 1841, Houston was reelected to a second term as president and his peaceful Indian policy was then reinstated. A treaty with the remaining Lnape and a few other tribes was negotiated in 1843 at Fort Bird and the Lenape were enlisted to help him make peace with the Comanche. Lenape scouts and their families were allowed to settle along the Brazos and Bosque rivers in order to influence the Comanche to come to the Texas government for a peace conference. The plan was successful and the Lenape helped bring the Comanches to a treaty council in 1844.

 State of Texas

In 1845, the Republic of Texas agreed to annexation by the US to become an American state. The Lenape continued their peaceful policy with the Americans and served as interpreters, scouts, and diplomats for the US Army and the Indian Bureau. In 1847, John Meusebach was assisted by Jim Shaw (a Lenape), in settling the German communities in the Texas Hill Country. For the remainder of his life, Shaw worked as a military scout in West Texas. In 1848, John Conner (Lenape) guided the Chihuahua-El Paso Expedition and was granted a league of land by a special act of the Texas legislature in 1853. The expeditions of the map maker Randolph B. Marcy through West Texas in 1849, 1852, and 1854 were guided by Black Beaver (Lenape).

In 1854, despite the history of peaceful relations, the last of the Texas Lenape were moved by the American government to the Brazos Indian Reservation near Graham, Texas. In 1859 the US forced the remaining Lenape to remove from Texas to a location on the Washita River in the vicinity of present Anadarko, Oklahoma.

20th century
In 1979, the United States Bureau of Indian Affairs revoked the tribal status of the Lenape living among Cherokee in Oklahoma. They began to count the Lenape as Cherokee. The Lenape had this decision overturned in 1996, when they were recognized by the federal government as a separate tribal nation.

21st century
The Cherokee Nation filed suit to overturn the independent federal recognition of the Lenape. The tribe lost federal recognition in a 2004 court ruling in favor of the Cherokee Nation but regained it on July 28, 2009. After recognition, the tribe reorganized under the Oklahoma Indian Welfare Act. Members approved a constitution and by laws in a May 26, 2009, vote. Jerry Douglas was elected as tribal chief.

In September 2000, the Delaware Nation of Oklahoma received  of land in Thornbury Township, Delaware County, Pennsylvania.

In 2004, the Delaware Nation filed suit against Pennsylvania in the United States District Court for the Eastern District of Pennsylvania, seeking to reclaim  included in the 1737 Walking Purchase to build a casino. In the suit titled The Delaware Nation v. Commonwealth of Pennsylvania, the plaintiffs, acting as the successor in interest and political continuation of the Lenni Lenape and of Lenape Chief Moses Tunda Tatamy, claimed aboriginal and fee title to the 315 acres of land located in Forks Township in Northampton County, near the town of Tatamy, Pennsylvania. After the Walking Purchase, Chief Tatamy was granted legal permission for him and his family to remain on this parcel of land, known as "Tatamy's Place". In addition to suing the state, the tribe also sued the township, the county and elected officials, including Gov. Ed Rendell.

Although the Walking Purchase forced the Lenape people to Oklahoma, not every Lenape lives in Oklahoma. Many Lenape continue to live in the Northeast. This community of people are the Munsee Lenape, and are currently in the process of applying for state recognition.

The court held that the justness of the extinguishment of aboriginal title is nonjusticiable, including in the case of fraud. Because the extinguishment occurred prior to the passage of the first Indian Nonintercourse Act in 1790, that Act did not avail the Lenape. As a result, the court granted the Commonwealth's motion to dismiss. In its conclusion the court stated: "... we find that the Delaware Nation's aboriginal rights to Tatamy's Place were extinguished in 1737 and that, later, fee title to the land was granted to Chief Tatamy—not to the tribe as a collectivity."

Contemporary tribes and organizations
 U.S. federally recognized tribes 
Three Lenape tribes are federally recognized in the United States. They are as follows:

 Delaware Nation, Anadarko, Oklahoma
 Delaware Tribe of Indians, Bartlesville, Oklahoma
 Stockbridge-Munsee Community, Bowler, Wisconsin.

Canadian First Nations
The Lenape who fled United States in the late 18th century settled in what is now Ontario. Canada recognizes three Lenape First Nations with four Indian reserves. They are all located in Southwestern Ontario.

Munsee-Delaware Nation, Canadian reserve near St. Thomas, Ontario.
Moravian of the Thames First Nation, Canadian reserve near Chatham-Kent.
Delaware of Six Nations (at Six Nations of the Grand River), two Canadian reserves near Brantford, Ontario.

State-recognized and unrecognized groups
Three groups who claim descent from Lenape people are state-recognized tribes.
 Lenape Indian Tribe of Delaware, Delaware
 Nanticoke-Lenni Lenape Tribal Nation, New Jersey
 Ramapough Lenape Nation, New Jersey

More than a dozen organizations in Delaware, Maryland, New Jersey, Pennsylvania, Virginia, and elsewhere claim descent from Lenape people and are unrecognized tribes. Organizations in Pennsylvania, Idaho and Kansas have petitioned the United States federal government for recognition."Petitions for Federal Recognition." 500 Nations. Retrieved 22 Jan 2012. One of these includes the Lenape Nation of Pennsylvania based in Easton, Pennsylvania.

Notable historical Lenape people
This includes only Lenape documented in history. Contemporary notable Lenape people are listed in the articles for the appropriate tribe.

 Richard C. Adams (1864–1921), Lenape author of collections of traditional narratives, legal advocate for Lenape in Washington, D.C.
 Black Beaver (1806–1880), trapper, trader and scout; first inductee into the American Indian Hall of Fame
 Buckongahelas (c. 1720–1805), Wolf clan war leader
 Nora Thompson Dean (Delaware Tribe of Indians, 1907–1984), linguist
 Hannah Freeman (1731–1802), purportedly the last surviving Lenape in Chester County, Pennsylvania
 Charles Journeycake (1817–1894), chief of the Wolf clan from 1855 and principal chief from 1861; visited Washington, D.C., 24 times on his tribe's behalf
Sachem Killbuck (Gelelemend), Turtle clan leader
 Captain Jacobs (died 1756), war chief
 Neolin (18th century), Lenape prophet
 Chief Newcomer (Netawatwees, c. 1686–1776), founder the village of Gekelmukpechunk (Newcomerstown), Ohio in the 1760s
 Oratam (16th century), sachem of the Hackensack
 Captain Pipe (Hopocan), (c. 1725–c. 1818), 18th century chief and member of the Wolf Clan
 Pisquetomen (died 1762), chief who assisted Christian Frederick Post in negotiating the Treaty of Easton in 1758
 Sassoonan or Allumapees (c. 1675–1747), 18th century chief and member of the Turtle clan
 Shingas (fl. 1740–1763), Turkey clan war leader
 Tamanend (c. 1625–c. 1701), leader reported to have negotiated treaty with William Penn, and for whom Tammany Hall was named
 Tamaqua (died c. 1770), chief who led peace negotiations following Pontiac's War
 Teedyuscung ((1700–1763), leader of the eastern Lenape
 Turtleheart, chief and warrior who represented the Lenape at the Treaty of Fort Stanwix in 1768 
 White Eyes (c. 1730–1778), Turtle clan peace chief who negotiated the Treaty of Fort Pitt

See also

 Burial Ridge
 Esopus people
 Hell Town, Ohio (Lenape settlement in Ohio)
 Lenape mythology
 Lenape settlements
 Mohicans
 Munsee
 Native American tribes in Maryland
 Okehocking people
 Ramapough Mountain Indians
 Shamokin
 Unalachtigo Lenape
 Walking Purchase
 Wappinger

Commentary

Notes

References
 Aberg, Alf. The People of New Sweden: Our Colony on the Delaware River, 1638–1655. (Natur & Kultur, 1988). .
 Acrelius, Israel. (Translated from Swedish with an introduction and notes by W.M. Reynolds). A History of New Sweden; or, the Settlements on the River Delaware. Ulan Press, 2011. .
 Bierhorst, John. Mythology of the Lenape: Guide and Texts. University of Arizona Press, 1995. .
 Brinton, Daniel G., C.F. Denke, and Albert Anthony. A Lenâpé – English Dictionary. Biblio Bazaar, 2009. .
 Burrows, Edward G. and Mike. Wallace. Gotham: A History of New York City to 1989. Oxford: Oxford University Press, 1999. .
 Carman, Alan, E. Footprints in Time: A History and Ethnology of The Lenape-Delaware Indian Culture. Trafford Publishing, 2013. .
 Dalton, Anne. The Lenape of Pennsylvania, New Jersey, New York, Delaware, Wisconsin, Oklahoma, and Ontario (The Library of Native Americans). Powerkids Publishing, 2005. .
 De Valinger, Leon, Jr. and C.A. Weslager. Indian Land Sales In Delaware: And A Discussion Of The Family Hunting Territory Question In Delaware. Literary Licensing LLC, 2013. .
 Donehoo, George P. A History of the Indian Villages and Place Names in Pennsylvania. Wennawoods Publishing, 1997. .
 Dreibelbis, Dana E., "The Use of Microstructural Growth Patterns of Mercenaria Mercenaria to Determine the Prehistoric Seasons of Harvest at Tuckerton Midden, Tuckerton, New Jersey", pp. 33, thesis, Princeton University, 1978.
 Frantz, Donald G. and Norma Jean Russell. Blackfoot Dictionary of Stems, Roots, and Affixes. University of Toronto Press, 1995. .
 Fur, Gunglong. A Nation of Women: Gender and Colonial Encounters Among the Delaware Indians (Early American Studies). University of Pennsylvania Press, 2012. .
 
 Grumet, Robert S. The Lenapes (Indians of North America). Chelsea House Publishing, 1989. .
 Harrington, Mark. A Preliminary Sketch of Lenape Culture. New Era Printing Company, 1913. .
 Harrington, Mark. Religion and Ceremonies of the Lenape. Forgotten Books, 2012. .
 Harrington, Mark R. Vestiges of Material Culture Among the Canadian Delawares. New Era Printing Company, 1908. .
 Harrington, Mark R. The Indians of New Jersey: Dickon Among the Lenapes. Rutgers University Press, 1963. .
 Heckewelder, John G.E. The History, Manners, and Customs of the Indian Nations Who Once Inhabited Pennsylvania and Neighboring States. Uhlan Publishing, 2012. .
 Heckewelder, John G.E. Names Which the Lenni Lenape or Delaware Indians Gave to Rivers, Streams, and Localities (Classic Reprint). Forgotten Books, 2012. .
 Hoffecker, Carol E., Richard Waldron, Lorraine E. Williams, and Barbara E. Benson (editors). New Sweden in America. University of Delaware Press, 1995.
 Jennings, Francis. Empire of Fortune. W. W. Norton and Company, 1990. .
 Jennings, Francis. The Ambiguous Iroquois Empire. W. W. Norton and Company, 1990. .
 Jennings, Francis. The History and Culture of Iroquois Diplomacy: An Interdisciplinary Guide to the Treaties of the Six Nations and Their League. Syracuse University Press, 1995. .
 Johnson, Amandus. The Swedish Settlements on the Delaware: Their History and Relation to the Indians, Dutch and English, 1638–1664 : With an Account of the South, the New Sweden Company, and the American Companies, and the Efforts of Sweden to Regain the Colony. University of Pennsylvania, 1911. .
 
 Kalter, Susan (editor). Benjamin Franklin, Pennsylvania, and the First Nations: The Treaties of 1736–62. University of Illinois Press, 2006. .
 Kraft, Herbert. The Lenape-Delaware Indian Heritage, 10,000 BC to AD 2000. Lenape Books, 2001. .
 Kurlansky, Mark. The Big Oyster: History on the Half Shell. Random House Trade Paperbacks, 2007. .
 Lindestrom, Peter. (Transcribed and edited by Amandus Johnson of the Swedish Colonial Society, Philadelphia, Pennsylvania). Geographia Americae: With an Account of the Delaware Indians, Based on Surveys and Notes made in 1654–1656 by Peter Lindestrom. Arno Press, 1979. .
 Marsh, Dawn G. A Lenape Among the Quakers: The Life of Hannah Freeman. University of Nebraska Press, 2014. .
 Middleton, Sam (Chief Mountain, "Neen Ees To-ko). Blackfoot Confederacy, Ancient and Modern. Kainai Chieftainship, 1951.
 Mitchell, S. H. Internet Archive The Indian Chief, Journeycake. Philadelphia: American Baptist Publication Society, 1895.
 Myers, Albert Cook. William Penn's Own Account of the Lenni Lenape or Delaware Indians. Middle Atlantic Press, 1981. .
 Myers, Albert Cook (editor). Narratives of Early Pennsylvania, West New Jersey and Delaware, 1630–1707. Nabu Press, 2012. .
 Newcomb, William W. The Culture and Acculturation of the Delaware Indians. University of Michigan, 1956. .
 Newman, Andrew. On Records: Delaware Indians, Colonists, and the Media of History and Memory. Lincoln: University of Nebraska Press, 2012. .
 Olmstead, Earl P. Blackcoats Among the Delaware: David Zeisberger on the Ohio Frontier. Kent State University Press, 1991. .
 Pritzker, Barry M. A Native American Encyclopedia: History, Culture, and Peoples. Oxford: Oxford University Press, 2000. .
 Repsher, Donald R. "Indian Place Names in Bucks County". As cited in https://web.archive.org/web/20131203011343/http://www.lenapenation.org/main.html. Retrieved March 15, 2012.
 Rice, Phillip W. English-Lenape Dictionary. N.P., N.D. See https://web.archive.org/web/20131203011343/http://www.lenapenation.org/main.html.
 Schutt, Amy C. Peoples of the River Valleys: The Odyssey of the Delaware Indians (Early American Studies). University of Pennsylvania Press, 2007. .
 Soderlund, Jean R. Lenape Country: Delaware Valley Society before William Penn. Philadelphia: University of Pennsylvania Press, 2014.
 Spady, James. "Colonialism and the Discursive Antecedents of Penn's Treaty with the Indians". Daniel K. Richter and William A. Pencak, eds. Friends and Enemies in Penn's Woods: Indians, Colonists, and the Racial Construction of Pennsylvania. Pennsylvania State University Press, 2004: 18–40.
 Trowbridge, C.C. Delaware Indian Language of 1824 (American Language Reprints Supplement Series; edited by James A. Rementer). Evolution Publications and Manufacturing, 2011. .
 Van Doren, Carl, and Julian P. Boyd. Indian Treaties Printed by Benjamin Franklin, 1736–1762. Nabu Press, 2011. .
 Vansina, Jan. Oral Tradition as History. Oxford, 1985. .
 Wallace, Paul, A.W. Indians in Pennsylvania (Revised Edition). Pennsylvania Historical and Museum Commission, 2000. .
 Wallace, Paul, A.W. Indian Paths of Pennsylvania. Pennsylvania Historical and Museum Commission, 1998. .
 Weslager, Clinton, Alfred (C.A). A Brief Account of the Indians of Delaware. Literary Licensing, LLC, 2012. .
 Weslager, C.A. A Man and His Ship: Peter Minuit and the Kalmar Nyckel. Middle Atlantic Press, 1990. .
 Weslager, C.A. Delaware's Buried Past: A Story of Archeological Adventure. Rutgers University Press, 1968. .
 Weslager, C.A. Delaware's Forgotten Folk: The Story of the Moors and Nanticokes. University of Pennsylvania Press, 2006. .
 Weslager, C.A. Delaware's Forgotten River: The Story of the Christina. Hambleton Company, 1947. .
 Weslager, C.A., and A. R. Dunlap. Dutch Explorers, Traders And Settlers In The Delaware Valley, 1609–1664. Literary Licensing, LLC, 2011. .
 Weslager, C.A. Magic Medicines of the Indians. Signet, 1974. .
 Weslager, C.A. New Sweden on the Delaware (Middle Atlantic Press, 1988). .
 Weslager, C.A. Red Men on the Brandywine (New and Enlarged Edition). Hambleton Company, 1953. .
 Weslager, C.A. The Delaware Indians: A History. New Brunswick, NJ: Rutgers University Press, 1972. .
 Weslager, C.A. The Delaware Indian Westward Migration: With the Texts of Two Manuscripts, 1821–22, Responding to General Lewis Cass's Inquiries about Lenape Culture and Language. Middle Atlantic Press, 1978. .
 Weslager, C.A. The English on the Delaware: 1610–1682. Rutgers University Press, 1967. .
 Weslager, C.A. The Nanticoke Indians: A Refugee Tribal Group of Pennsylvania. Pennsylvania Historical and Museum Commission, 1948). .
 Weslager, C.A. The Swedes and Dutch at New Castle. Middle Atlantic Press, 1990. .
 Zeisberger, David. A Lenâpé-English Dictionary: From An Anonymous [Manuscript] In The Archives Of The Moravian Church At Bethlehem, [Pennsylvania]. Nabu Press, 2012. .
 Zeisberger, David. David Zeisberger's History of Northern American Indians (Classic Reprint). Forgotten Books, 2012. .
 Zeisberger, David. Grammar of the Language of the Lenni Lenape or Delaware Indians. Forgotten Books, 2012. .
 Zeisberger, David. The Diary of David Zeisberger: A Moravian Missionary Among the Ohio Indians, Volume 1. Ulan Press, 2012. .
 Zeisberger, David. The Diary of David Zeisberger: A Moravian Missionary Among the Ohio Indians, Volume 2. Ulan Press, 2012. .
 Zeisberger, David. Zeisberger's Indian Dictionary: English, German, Iroquois—The Onondaga and Algonquin—The Delaware. Harvard University Press, 1887. . "The Delaware" that Zeisberger translated was Munsee, and not Unami.

Further reading
 Adams, Richard Calmit, The Delaware Indians, a brief history, Hope Farm Press (Saugerties, NY 1995) [originally published by Government Printing Office, (Washington, DC 1909)]
 Bierhorst, John. The White Deer and Other Stories Told by the Lenape. New York: W. Morrow, 1995. 
 Brown, James W. and Rita T. Kohn, eds. Long Journey Home . Indiana University Press (2007).
 
 Kraft, Herbert: The Lenape: Archaeology, History, and Ethnography. New Jersey Historical Society, 1987. .
 Kraft, Herbert. The Lenape or Delaware Indians: The Original People of New Jersey, Southeastern New York State, Eastern Pennsylvania, northern Delaware and parts of western Connecticut. Lenape Books, 1996. .
 O'Meara, John, Delaware-English / English-Delaware dictionary, Toronto: University of Toronto Press (1996) .
 Otto, Paul, The Dutch-Munsee Encounter in America: The Struggle for Sovereignty in the Hudson Valley (New York: Berghahn Books, 2006). 
 Pritchard, Evan T., Native New Yorkers: The Legacy of the Algonquin People of New York. Council Oak Books: San Francisco, 2002, 2007. .
 Richter, Conrad, The Light In The Forest.'' New York: 1953.

External links 

 
 Delaware Tribe of Indians, official website
 Stockbridge-Munsee Community, official website
 Lenape Center
 Museum of Indian Culture
 Lenape/English dictionary
 Lenape (Southern Unami) Talking Dictionary
 

 
Indigenous peoples of the Northeastern Woodlands
Eastern Algonquian peoples
Native American history of Delaware
Native American history of Pennsylvania
Native American history of New Jersey
Native American tribes in Delaware
Native American tribes in New Jersey
Native American tribes in New York (state)
Native American tribes in Pennsylvania
People of New Netherland
First Nations in Ontario
Native American tribes in Indiana
Native American tribes in Ohio
Native American tribes in Wisconsin
Native American tribes in Oklahoma
Algonquian ethnonyms
Native American tribes in Texas
Native Americans in the American Revolution